Lachnoclostridium is a genus of bacteria in the family Lachnospiraceae.

References

Further reading

 
 

 

Taxa described in 2002
Lachnospiraceae
Bacteria genera